Shimmies in Super 8 is a rare compilation released in United Kingdom in April 1993 as a double pack. Its catalogue number is DS45 – 05/06. DS45 – 05 is a white vinyl 7", DS45 – 06 is a green vinyl. Both 7"s were housed in a folder cardboard sleeve in a plastic bag. This album features two of the four songs produced by Darlin', a French indie rock group composed of Thomas Bangalter, Guy-Manuel De Homem Christo (later of Daft Punk) and Laurent Brancowitz (later of Phoenix). Some copies includes a Darlin' sticker roughly 400, Darlin' paper insert and a Colm paper insert, designed by de Homem Christo. All copies were numbered (800 copies). A few light blue test pressings are also known to exist.

Track listing

7" white vinyl (DS45 – 05)
Side A
"Trafalgar Square" by Huggy Bear – 0:47
"Godziller" by Huggy Bear – 2:22
"More Music from Bells" by Huggy Bear – 0:49
"Snow White, Rose Red" by Huggy Bear – 1.13

Side B
"Cindy, So Loud" by Darlin' – 1:18
"Darlin'" by Darlin' – 2:38

7" green vinyl (DS45 – 06)
Side C
"Soundtrack" by Colm – 4:40

Side D
"Revox!" by Stereolab – 4:05

References

External links
Shimmies In Super 8's profile on Discogs.com
Duophonic official website
Darlin's official MySPace profile

1993 compilation albums
Stereolab compilation albums